Bylong Valley Way is a New South Wales country road linking the Golden Highway near Sandy Hollow to the Castlereagh Highway near Ilford. It is named after the Bylong Valley, through which the road passes.

Route
In conjunction with the Bathurst-Ilford Road to Bathurst, this quiet, scenic route provides a leisurely alternative to going through Sydney to travel between the Hunter Region and Central Tablelands.

History
The passing of the Main Roads Act of 1924 through the Parliament of New South Wales provided for the declaration of Main Roads, roads partially funded by the State government through the Main Roads Board (later the Department of Main Roads, and eventually Transport for NSW). Main Road No. 208 was declared from Sandy Hollow to Bylong (and continuing west via Wollar to Mudgee, and east via Wybong to the intersection with Great Northern Highway, today New England Highway, at Muswellbrook), and Main Road No. 215 was declared from Bylong via Rylstone to Ilford, on the same day, 8 August 1928.

Sealing

The Bylong Valley Way was not fully sealed in the Mid-Western Regional Council area until February 2009. Sealing of the road had been a political issue for decades. At the beginning of 2007, there were four sections of unsealed road totalling 32 kilometres. Two sections were between Coxs Gap and Bylong with only 850 metres of sealed road between them. The other two were south of Bylong on the way towards Rylstone, where two kilometres had been sealed a few years earlier, converting one long unsealed section to two shorter ones.

On 13 December 2006, The federal government announced A$2 million of Auslink funding towards the $4.1 million cost of completion of sealing of the Bylong Valley Way. Under the announced funding arrangement, the New South Wales Roads and Traffic Authority contributed $900,000 and the Mid-Western Regional Council was to contribute the remaining $1.2 million. The overall cost slightly exceed the budgeted $4.1 million, with the council having to cover the overrun.

The sealing work was carried out by Mid-Western Regional Council and was completed in three stages:

Stage One
March 2007 to June 2007
Sealing of two sections totalling six kilometres south of Bylong
Widening a total of nine kilometres of remaining unsealed road in preparation for sealing in the later stages

Stage Two
July 2007 to June 2008
Sealing of two remaining unsealed sections south of Bylong totalling 12.42 kilometres
Sealing of one section one kilometre long adjacent to existing sealed section east of Bylong
Preparatory works for stage three

Stage Three
July 2008 to March 2009
Completion of sealing, consisting of two sections east of Bylong totalling 12.6 kilometres

National Park access

Access to the Wollemi National Park and Goulburn River National Park is available at various points along the road between the Golden Highway and Bylong. Over Coxs Gap, the Bylong Valley Way is flanked by the two national parks. Camping areas are available in the Wollemi National Park on the western side of Coxs Gap, and the Phipps Cutting picnic area between Baerami and Widden Creek provides an entry point for hiking in the Wollemi National Park.

Tourism
Following completion of sealing of the road, The Muswellbrook Chamber of Commerce and Industry  created a web site for the road, to promote it as a tourist route.

The section of the Bylong Valley Way east of Bylong is also part of two separately promoted tourist routes.

A self-drive tour loop route originating in Sandy Hollow, promoted as Upper Hunter Tourist Drive number 4, uses this section of road to travel west, then turns north on other local roads to rejoin the Golden Highway. The Phipps Cutting picnic area is shown as a rest area on that route.

The Tablelands Way tourist route between Canberra and Muswellbrook uses this section of the Bylong Valley Way as part of the route between Mudgee and Muswellbrook.

Bridges

Muswellbrook Shire Council 
The dilapidated timber sections of the Kirks Bridge, crossing Baerami Creek at Baerami were demolished and were planned to be replaced with new concrete sections by 31 August 2007. Unfortunately, flooding during the June 2007 Hunter Region and Central Coast storms delayed the work by around a month. The bridge had previously been partially rebuilt, with both buttresses and two spans at one end having been reconstructed in concrete.

Muswellbrook Shire Council maintained a temporary deviation on private property for several years to allow access during bridgework and for heavy vehicles. After the bridge was reopened, that deviation was removed and the land returned to its owner.

The single-lane timber bridge over Widden Creek has also been replaced. Muswellbrook Shire Council had committed to spend $480,000 by 30 June 2007 to Manage the investigation, design and construction works but the discovery of a serious problem on Kirks Bridge saw that money diverted to the more urgent project. Muswellbrook Shire Council subsequently replaced the Widden Creek bridge between January and June 2009 at a cost of approximately A$910,000.

Once the Widden Creek bridge was replaced, the 38 tonne load limit was lifted, allowing heavy vehicles to again use this route.

Mid-Western Regional Council 
Mid-Western Regional council plan to replace the single lane Carwell Bridge between Kandos and Ilford between mid-2009 and mid-2010.

Railway 

The Sandy Hollow–Gulgong railway line and part of the Merriwa railway line, which form the Australian Rail Track Corporation's Ulan line between Muswellbrook and Gulgong, follow the same valleys as the Bylong Valley Way from near the Golden Highway to near Bylong, where the railway line continues west as the road turns south.

The Ulan line crosses the road three times, twice at level crossings and once on a bridge over the road. One level crossing is close to the Golden Highway while the other is close to Bylong. The railway bridge is on the western side of Coxs Gap, between the level crossings.

The Gwabegar railway line crosses the road on at a level crossing the northern side of Rylstone.

All three of the level crossings have flashing warning lights but not boom gates.

Major intersections

See also

 Highways in Australia
 List of highways in New South Wales

Gallery

References

External links

Highways in New South Wales